Tepatitlán Fútbol Club, commonly known as Alteños de Tepatitlán, or just Tepa, is a Mexican football club based in Tepatitlán. The club was founded in 1944, and currently plays in the Liga de Expansión MX.

History

The people's team

Its beginnings were after a selection for Regional Tournament with the aim of reaching if they were victorious to the state championship. The Mission was appointed to Fausto Prieto, this team was called The People's Team.

Some names of players that appear in the years of 1944-1946 are: Luis Veles, Miguel Escoto "El Mugres", Andrés González "The different", Max Prieto, Goyo Franco, Gregorio Gómez, Enrique Estrada, Roberto Estrada "El Rocha" , Elio Vázquez, Eleuterio Silva, "Tello Silva the face of a cock", Arnulfo de la Torre "El Casarín" and Rafael Martínez "El Piwe".

Championship Promotion Final 2017–18

On 19 May 2018, Tepatitlán was proclaimed champion of the 2017-18 season of Serie A de México after defeating Loros UdeC by penalty shootout in the promotion final. However, they were not promoted to Ascenso MX and were forced to remain in Serie A after the Mexican Football Federation ruled the club did not meet the necessary requirements.

 "We were 20 seconds away from being sad ... but we touched the back of the medal. And now only plan well what will be the next tournament and work as we have been doing with great enthusiasm to do something important and hopefully gave us a next championship to have the direct promotion," said Enrique López Zarza, a Reporter of the Premier League.

New era

On 15 June 2020, the team was renamed as Tepatitlán F.C. and adopted the nickname Alteños, with the aim of representing the entire region, Los Altos de Jalisco. in addition to a possible integration in the Liga de Expansión MX. On July 17, Tepatitlán F.C. was accepted at Liga de Expansión as an expansion team.

On 19 August 2020 the team debuted in the new category, Tepatitlán drew with Atlético Morelia 2-2. Mauricio López scored the club's first goal in the Liga de Expansión.

2021 Guardians Clausura Tournament Champion 

For the Clausura 2021 tournament, the Alteña squad performed a regular tournament in which they finished in 6th. place of the general, already for the league he faced Dorados de Sinaloa, Cimarrones de Sonora and Mineros de Zacatecas.

On May 15, 2021, the team was proclaimed champion of the Liga de Expansión MX. Los Alteños won the title after drawing 2-2 as visitors against Atlético Morelia, the club claimed their 1-0 victory in the first leg and thus won the championship.

Champion of Champions 2020-21 

A week later, on May 22, the team won its second title by winning the 2020-21 Champion of Champions of the  Liga de Expansión MX after defeating Tampico Madero in a series of penalties. The Alteños tied at two goals on aggregate after winning 2-0 at home and leveling the series, finally, in the series from eleven steps, the club won 5-3.

Players

Current squad

Out on loan

Personnel

Coaching staff

Reserve teams

Tepatitlán F.C. "B" (Liga TDP) 
Reserve team that plays in the Liga TDP, the fourth level of the Mexican league system.

The Classic Alteño 

In this division there is a great rivalry with the rival of the city the Club and the C.D. Aves Blancas, so it has become a classic; "The Classic Alteño" is the name given to the football matches that face each other, the two most representative teams from the city of Tepatitlán de Morelos, Jalisco, the Tepatitlán and the Aves Blancas.

The sporting rivalry of both clubs is manifested through the numerous confrontations that throughout history, both in corresponding official matches of the Third Division; for several years it was the highest category for the city, hence a rivalry against the town's team was generated; in addition to state tournaments and local league.

Alteños Acatic F.C. 

Reserve team that plays in the Liga TDP, the fourth level of the Mexican league system.

Honours

Official tournaments

References

External links

Association football clubs established in 2015
Football clubs in Jalisco
Tepatitlán
2015 establishments in Mexico
Liga Premier de México